Nguyễn Minh Phong (born 15 September 1986) is a Vietnamese footballer who plays as a goalkeeper for V-League (Vietnam) club QNK Quảng Nam F.C.

References

1986 births
Living people
Vietnamese footballers
Quang Nam FC players
V.League 1 players
People from Nghệ An province
Association football goalkeepers